Yazdanabad-e Sharqi (also Romanized as Yazdānābād-e Sharqī; also known as Yazdānābād) is a village in Dughayi Rural District, in the Central District of Quchan County, Razavi Khorasan Province, Iran. At the 2006 census, its population was 41, in 10 families.

References 

Populated places in Quchan County